The IPSC German Rifle Championship is an IPSC level 3 championship held once a year by the Federation of German Marksmen.

Champions 
The following is a list of current and previous champions.

Overall category

Lady category

Junior category

Senior category

Super Senior category

References 

Match Results - 2012 IPSC German Rifle Championship
Match Results - 2015 IPSC German Rifle Championship
Match Results - 2016 IPSC German Rifle Championship
Match Results - 2017 IPSC German Rifle Championship
Match Results - 2018 IPSC German Rifle Championship

IPSC shooting competitions
National shooting championships
Shooting competitions in Germany
Germany sport-related lists
Rifle